Strtenica is a small settlement in the Kozje region in eastern Slovenia. It belongs to the Municipality of Šmarje pri Jelšah. The municipality is part of the historical Styria region and is now included in the Savinja Statistical Region.

References

External links
Strtenica at Geopedia

Populated places in the Municipality of Šmarje pri Jelšah